AD 55 (LV) was a common year starting on Wednesday (link will display the full calendar) of the Julian calendar. At the time, it was known as the Year of the Consulship of Caesar and Vetus (or, less frequently, year 808 Ab urbe condita). The denomination AD 55 for this year has been used since the early medieval period, when the Anno Domini calendar era became the prevalent method in Europe for naming years.

Events

By place

Roman Empire 
 Emperor Nero becomes a Roman Consul.
 The Roman jurist Sabinus writes three books on the rights of citizens.

By topic

Religion 
 The apostle Paul writes his First Epistle to the Corinthians.

Births 
 Epictetus, Greek-Roman philosopher (d. 135)

Deaths 
 February 11 – Britannicus, son of Claudius (b. AD 41)
 Antonia Tryphaena, Roman client queen (b. 10 BC)
 Izates bar Monobaz, Parthian client king (b. c. AD 1)

References 

0055

als:50er#55